Khomeyn County is in Markazi province, Iran. The capital of the county is the city of Khomeyn. At the 2006 census, the county's population was 108,840 in 29,888 households. The following census in 2011 counted 107,368 people in 33,327 households. At the 2016 census, the county's population was 105,017 in 34,611 households.

The county of Khomeyn is located to the south of Markazi province, in a fertile plain. The climate is moderate mountainous inclining to a semi-desert. Winters are cold and summers are moderate. This county lies at a distance of 323 km. from Tehran. The name "Khomeyn" was primarily mentioned in a book named The History of Prophets and Kings. Subterranean canals (qanats), sewers and its famous fire-temple are among the pre-Islamic relics. This region was called the center of Kamareh 200 years ago. 

The county is currently famous as the birthplace of Ruhollah Khomeini, leader of the Islamic Revolution. His father's house has become an important historical monument.

Administrative divisions

The population history of Khomeyn County's administrative divisions over three consecutive censuses is shown in the following table. The latest census shows two districts, seven rural districts, and two cities.

Archaeology 
According to The Journal of Orthoptera Research, in 2017-2018, a rock carving of a six-legged mantis named Empusa hedenborgii with raptorial forearms was revealed in the Teimareh rock-art site. An engraved, insect-like image has a 14cm length and 11cm width, with two circles at its sides that probably dates 40,000–4,000 years ago. This motif is analogous to the famous "squatter man" petroglyph encountered at several locations around the world.

References

 

Counties of Markazi Province